Operation Wishbone was a military operation in Angola during December 1980 by the South African Defence Force (SADF) and South African Air Force (SAAF) during the Angolan Civil War and South African Border War.

Background
The mission called for mid-level bombing attacks by the South African Air Force (SAAF) against SWAPO's PLAN bases in Angola at Oshiheng near Ongiva and Palele close to Xangongo. Four formations of aircraft were assembled at either airbases at Grootfontein or Ondangwa in Namibia/South West Africa. The aircraft formations consisted of either four Buccaneers or Mirage F1's and one lead aircraft, a Canberra bomber. The Canberra bomber would signal when the bombs would be dropped on the target. The operation took place 19 December 1980.

Aftermath
Intelligence gathered after the attack proved that the bombing at the height chosen had been inaccurate and that the PLAN bases were unoccupied during the attack..

References

Further reading
 
 
 

Conflicts in 1980
Military history of Angola
Wishbone
Wishbone, Operation
1980 in Angola
1980 in South Africa